D.A.V. Centenary Public School, Nilokheri  is a private school teaching students in kindergarten through twelfth grade from Nilokheri township of Karnal in Haryana, India. D.A.V. Centenary Public School, Nilokheri along with S.D.M.N. Vidya Mandir is among the private high schools in Nilokheri with high standards of education.

The school opened in 1989. In the 2007–08 academic year, the school enrolled over 2,500 students and employed 60 classroom teachers.

History
D.A.V. Centenary Public School, Nilokheri was established in 1989 by Dayanand Anglo Vedic College Trust & Management Society  and is affiliated to Central Board of Secondary Education . It is administered by the school committee members.

Campus
Earlier the school building was situated in the interior of the city later the management committee bought the land at the outskirts of township near Near Press Colony, Detention tank area.

Disciplines
The school provides education to children of all ages and interests.
 Kindergarten
 Senior Secondary
 High School
 Commerce
 Medical
 Non-Medical

References

1989 establishments in Haryana
Schools in Haryana
Nilokheri
Educational institutions established in 1989